Förbundet Arbetarfront (Workers' Front League) was a group that existed in Sweden during the Second World War. It published a newspaper called Arbetarfront - För Socialism & Demokrati (Workers' Front - For Socialism & Democracy).

External links
 Info on Arbetarfront from the Royal Library

World War II non-governmental organizations
Political organizations based in Sweden